The 1978 Arkansas Razorbacks football team represented the University of Arkansas in the Southwest Conference (SWC) during the 1978 NCAA Division I-A football season. In their second year under head coach Lou Holtz, the Razorbacks compiled a 9–2–1 record (6–2 against SWC opponents), finished in a tie for second place in the SWC, and outscored their opponents by a combined total of 336 to 147. The Razorbacks' only losses were to SWC champion Houston by a 20–9 score and to Texas by a 28–21 score. The team advanced to 1978 Fiesta Bowl, playing to a 10–10 tie with UCLA.  Arkansas was ranked #11 in the final AP Poll and #10 in the final UPI Coaches Poll.

Schedule

Roster
QB Ron Calcagni, Sr.
Dan Hampton
QB Kevin Scanlon, Jr.
G George Stewart
WR T.E. Ratliff
P Bruce Lahay

References

Arkansas
Arkansas Razorbacks football seasons
Fiesta Bowl champion seasons
Arkansas Razorbacks football